The Joseph Hallock House is a historic house located at 241 West Main Street in Catskill, Greene County, New York.

Description and history 
built in about 1855, the two-story residence is architecturally significant as a highly intact representation of the mid-nineteenth-century architecture of the town. Its style is transitional, with elements of both Greek Revival and Italianate styles.

It was added to the National Register of Historic Places on August 10, 1995.

References

Houses on the National Register of Historic Places in New York (state)
Houses completed in 1855
Greek Revival houses in New York (state)
Italianate architecture in New York (state)
Houses in Greene County, New York
National Register of Historic Places in Greene County, New York
Catskill, New York